Kuchadri Venkateswara Swamy temple is an ancient Hindu temple of Lord Balaji in Kuchanpally village  of Medak mandal of Medak district in Indian state of Telangana. In 2011 then government of andhra pradesh declared kuchadri temple as a protected monument.

References

Vishnu temples
Hindu temples in Medak district